The Trail of the Shadow is a lost 1917 American silent drama film. Directed by Edwin Carewe, the film stars Emmy Wehlen, William B. Davidson, and Harry S. Northrup. It was released on June 18, 1917.

Cast

References

External links
 The Trail of the Shadow at IMDb.com

1917 films
Metro Pictures films
American silent feature films
American black-and-white films
1917 drama films
Films produced by B. A. Rolfe
Films directed by Edwin Carewe
1910s American films